"All I Wanna Do" is a song by the American rock band the Beach Boys from their 1970 album Sunflower. Written by Brian Wilson and Mike Love, the recording's use of layering, reverb and delay effects led it to be retrospectively cited as the earliest example of dream pop and chillwave, as well as a precursor to shoegaze. It was also influential for many lo-fi acts.

The song was initially attempted for the albums Friends (1968) and 20/20 (1969). Carl Wilson produced the version that appeared on Sunflower, likely with assistance from Brian, and with lead vocals by Love. The arrangement features multiple vocal parts sung in counterpoint, 12-string guitar, Rocksichord, electric sitar, and a Moog synthesizer played by engineer Stephen Desper.

Brian later said that he felt it was "a boring song" that "wasn't done right". The band never performed it in concert, although Love's touring edition of the group did, in 2015. In 2018, an earlier version of the track was released on the compilation I Can Hear Music: The 20/20 Sessions. In 2021, isolated vocals and backing track versions were released on Feel Flows.

Composition
"All I Wanna Do" was written by the band's Brian Wilson and Mike Love. The instrumentation consists of 12-string guitar, Rocksichord, electric sitar, drums, double bass, electric bass, piano, shaker, and Moog synthesizer. According to academic Philip Lambert,

Talking about the song in 1995, Brian expressed: "That was one of those songs that had a nice chord pattern, but I think it was a boring song, and I thought it wasn't done right. I thought it should have been softer, with boxed guitars." In 2000, he called the song "a real nice one". In 2015, Love commented that "All I Wanna Do" was "totally poetic and quite heartfelt".

Recording

"All I Wanna Do" was produced by Carl Wilson, likely with assistance from Brian, at various professional studios, including the band's own private studio. On February 24, 1968, an early version of the song was recorded during the Friends sessions. Another version was recorded on May 24 and June 8. One of these versions, which makes use of a sitar-like instrument,  appears on the 2018 compilation: I Can Hear Music: The 20/20 Sessions.

Another session for the song took place on March 19, 1969, at Gold Star Studios. The final arrangement opted for a guitar line which Mathew Greenwald of AllMusic describes as "Byrds-like". Heavy reverb was applied to the mix. Carl played 12-string guitar, Rocksichord, and electric sitar, while engineer Stephen Desper played Moog synthesizer. The remaining instrumentalist roles were filled in by various session musicians. The vocals were recorded at the band's studio, as overdubs onto the Gold Star track, and feature all six members, with Love handling the lead.

Critical reception
In 1970, Jim Miller of Rolling Stone noted production elements made the listening experience "mind-wrenching". Greenwald called the song a lost classic, writing: "Possibly one of the most beautiful and unusual songs and recordings on the Sunflower album... Mike Love deserves high marks for his vocal and lyric contributions, which may be his most tasteful in the scope of the entire Beach Boys canon. Brian Wilson's haunting, minor-key melody and ghostly arrangement is truly bittersweet evidence that he had certainly not lost his artistic grasp." Greenwald afforded accolades to the song's arrangement, citing the effectiveness of the piccolo snare drum and the well-executed harmonies.

A 2016 reader's poll conducted by Rolling Stone ranked it the fourth-best Beach Boys song that was not a hit record. In 2021, the song was ranked number eight on Ultimate Classic Rocks listicle of the finest "post-Pet Sounds Beach Boys songs". Contributor Nick Deriso noted that the song resembled "a prehistoric dream-pop song" and had been admired by many "bedroom-recording chillwave kids". In 2022, The Guardians Alexis Petridis ranked it number 17 on a list of the greatest Beach Boys songs.

Influence
"All I Wanna Do" has been cited as the origin of the dream pop, shoegaze, and chillwave genres. Critic Jim Allen, who cites the Beach Boys as the "godfathers" of dream pop, says that the song's unprecedented "cinematic dream sequence" production style marks the point "where the dream pop family tree starts to come into focus." However, because the group were predominantly known for hit singles such as "Kokomo" during the 1980s, critics had largely disregarded the band's 1970s recording output, and the Beach Boys' impact on the genre was not widely acknowledged until after the 2000s. Allen goes on to draw connections between the sound of "All I Wanna Do" and acts such as the Radio Dept., M83, Panda Bear, Beach House, A Sunny Day in Glasgow, and Au Revoir Simone.

Writing in Record Collector, Jamie Atkins said that the song ranks among the Beach Boys' "most subtly influential – makers of ambrosial lo-fi, from Galaxie 500 to Ariel Pink to Panda Bear, owe plenty to its reverb-heavy sound." American Songwriters Catherine Wathall supported that the song contained a "chillwave essence", while the publication Future Music listed the song as part of a "beginner's guide" to chillwave. In his retrospective review of Sunflower, Pitchforks  Hefner Macauley acknowledged the song as a work of "proto-shoegaze". Katie Cameron of Paste concurred that the song was an "undeniably cool shoegazing precursor".

Live performances
The Beach Boys never performed the song in concert. In 2015, Mike Love's touring version of the Beach Boys briefly began playing the song live for the first time.

Personnel

Credits sourced from Beach Boys archivist Craig Slowinski.

The Beach Boys
 Al Jardine – harmony and backing vocals
 Bruce Johnston – harmony and backing vocals
 Mike Love – lead vocals, harmony and backing vocals
 Brian Wilson – harmony and backing vocals
 Carl Wilson – harmony and backing vocals, 12-string lead guitar, Rocksichord, electric sitar, production
 Dennis Wilson – harmony and backing vocals
Additional musicians and production staff
 Hal Blaine – drums
 Jimmy Bond – double bass, electric bass
 Al Casey –  rhythm guitar
 Gene Estes – shaker
 Mike Melvoin – piano
 Stephen Desper – engineer, Moog synthesizer
 Doc Siegel – engineer

References

External links
 
 
 
 

1970 songs
The Beach Boys songs
Songs written by Mike Love
Songs written by Brian Wilson
Song recordings produced by the Beach Boys
Chillwave
Dream pop songs